This is a list of broadcast television stations that are licensed in the U.S. state of Montana.

Full-power stations
VC refers to the station's PSIP virtual channel. RF refers to the station's physical RF channel.

Defunct full-power stations
Channel 4: KOPR-TV - CBS/ABC - Butte (8/23/1953-9/19/1954)
Channel 9: KBBJ - satellite of KTVH-DT - Havre (2000-2008)
Channel 9: KGEZ-TV/KULR - Kalispell (7/9/1957-4/7/1958, 10/26/1958-5/27/1959)
Channel 13: KBAO - satellite of KTVH-DT - Lewistown (2000-2008)
Channel 17: KMMF - Fox - Missoula (2002-6/12/2009)
Channel 24: KBTZ - Fox - Butte (5/2/2003-6/12/2009)
Channel 26: KLMN - Fox - Great Falls (6/11/2003-6/12/2009)

LPTV stations

Translators

Montana

Television stations